Kazantzakis may refer to the following:

 Nikos Kazantzakis (1883–1957), a Greek writer
 Nikos Kazantzakis Museum in Myrtia, Greece
 Kazantzakis (2017), a feature film directed by Yannis Smaragdis
 Heraklion International Airport "Nikos Kazantzakis", on Crete, Greece
 Nikos Kazantzakis (municipality), a former administrative division in Crete, Greece
 F/B N. Kazantzakis (1989-2001), a former vessel of Minoan Lines